Jahan Qaleh (also Romanized as Jahān Qal‘eh; also known as Jahan Ghal‘eh and Jān Qal‘eh) is a village in Hamzehlu Rural District, in the Central District of Khomeyn County, Markazi Province, Iran. At the 2006 census, its population was 243, in 62 families.

References 

Populated places in Khomeyn County